RocKwiz is an Australian television live music trivia quiz show, focused on rock music and featuring different guest artist musicians who perform live in each episode. The show was co-created by Brian Nankervis, Peter Bain-Hogg, and Ken Connor. It is broadcast on SBS and premiered in 2005 also on Foxtel's Max. The 14th and final season premiered on 7 May 2016. Season 14 consisted of 7 episodes, recorded between February and April 2016, with the theme "RocKwiz Salutes The Legends". The final episode aired on 25 June 2016. The series won the 2007 AACTA Award for Best Light Entertainment Television Series and was nominated in the same category three times, it was also nominated for a Helpmann Award. On February 3, 2019 it was announced that SBS would no longer be commissioning any more TV episodes although the live touring shows would continue.

In October 2022, it was announced the series will be revived by Foxtel and will air on Fox8 in 2023 with eight 30 minute long episodes.

Summary
The program is hosted by Julia Zemiro and originally aired on Saturdays at 8:30 pm, except in 2014 when it aired on Mondays at 9:30 pm. Regular episodes are shot in The Gershwin Room at St Kilda's Esplanade Hotel, commonly called just The Espy, in Melbourne. The program format typically puts local lesser-known singers alongside more well known Australian and international musicians in a show closing duet after they have led teams of contestants chosen from the audience in a trivia quiz. It has a cult following for its no-frills style. The show features the "RocKwiz Orkestra" which provides musical clues and backing for the special music guests and, where needed, the contestants.

RocKwiz has also become a successful touring franchise and has staged national tours and special appearances at festivals. Occasionally these live tour shows are filmed for TV broadcast.

Cast

Hosts 

The show is hosted by Julia Zemiro, with Brian Nankervis as the scorer and "adjudicator where necessary". Dugald McAndrew is the roadie who features as a "human scoreboard". The show had the following guest hosts while Julia Zemiro was away on Eurovision duties:
 Tex Perkins (10 January 2009 and 27 February 2010)
 David McCormack (17 January 2009)

House Band 
The RocKwiz Orkestra comprises:
 Peter "Lucky" Luscombe – drums, lead vocals
 "Jumping" James Black (2005 - 2014) (see The Black Sorrows, Mondo Rock) – guitar, Hammond organ, vocals
 Mark Ferrie (former member of Sacred Cowboys and Models) – bass guitar
Ashley Naylor (2015 - 2016) – guitars, vocals
Clio Renner (2015 - 2016, 2023) – keyboards, vocals
Bill McDonald (2023) - bass guitar
Olympia (2023) - lead guitar and vocals
The Wolfgramm Sisters originally provided backing vocals, including many Christmas Specials, Comedy Festivals and RocKwiz Salute the Bowl performances.
Vika and Linda Bull frequently provide backing vocals for the guest.

Rounds
The quiz comprises five rounds, and one preliminary round called "Ready Steady RocKwiz" which happens off air to select the contestants for the show from the live audience at the venue on the night. A notable feature of the show is its very casual attitude to the scoring system – a fact Brian once addressed on his introductory segment after apparently receiving some complaints from viewers. A common example of this is the awarding of "bonus points", often done when one team appears to be dominant.
 Ready Steady RocKwiz – Early series of RocKwiz often opened with this pre-recorded segment, however more recently this is all done off air. Brian Nankervis runs three or four rounds of questions to find four finalists from 24 players to make up the two teams later for the TV episode recording. After the footage has been shown and the guests introduced, Julia Zemiro will usually ask the four guests what the first album they ever bought was, and/or what the first concert they ever went to was. The title of this segment is an allusion to the 1960s British pop music TV show Ready Steady Go!.
 Who Can it Be Now? – This round introduces the show's two musical guests for the evening. Clues are read out in a "Who Am I?" style, and a team buzzes in when they know the answer. Ten points are awarded, and then the guest arrives and performs a song. The first guest announced will join the team that correctly guessed them, then the next guest joins the other team (after also performing a song), although the first team can still answer the question. Julia usually asks the guests about their first concert and/or album bought as well. The title and theme music of this segment comes from the 1981 song "Who Can It Be Now?" by Australian group Men at Work.

 Local and/or General – As the title suggests, this is a general knowledge music quiz section. The title of this segment comes from the album title and song by Australian group Models on their 1981 album of the same name.
 Million Dollar Riff – The RocKwiz Orkestra plays a series of notable riffs and a team buzzes in when they recognise the riff. The riff played as the intro in the first 12 series is from AC/DC's "Back In Black". More recently the intro music reflects the title of this segment which comes from the 1975 song by Australian group Skyhooks.
 Master Blaster – The musical guests are given a number of questions, usually around five, to answer, on a specialist subject they have nominated. The title and theme music of this segment comes from the 1980 song "Master Blaster (Jammin')" by Stevie Wonder.
 Whole Lotta Facts - This segment replaced Master Blaster in Season 11. The musical guests essentially pick a topic and talk (or sometimes sing) on that topic.  The riff played as the intro is from "Whole Lotta Love" by Led Zeppelin, which also inspired the segment name. This segment did not reappear in Series 12.
 Thirty Three and a Third - A new segment for Season 11.  Each team has 33 and one third seconds to answer as many questions as they can. The title of the segment comes from the number of revolutions per minute of a vinyl album. There is no intro riff. While it shares its name with the 1976 George Harrison album "Thirty Three & 1/3", there is no evidence to suggest it was named after this record.
 The Middle Eight - Another new segment introduced in Series 11. Eight questions with the last three questions having the same answer, a performer's name, and that artist will make a surprise appearance to perform a song.
 Furious Five – This round involves "five or so" minutes of fast and furious questions to both teams. Usually, the Furious Five does not quite reach the five-minute mark. The title of this segment comes from the American group Grandmaster Flash and the Furious Five and the theme music is composed of five 'furious' notes.

To close each show the musical guests perform a duet accompanied by the RocKwiz Orkestra. Four volumes of the best duets have been released on CD & DVD and some of the duets are available on iTunes.

Episodes

As of June 2016, fourteen seasons of the show had been broadcast on SBS. In addition to the regular episodes, there have been a number of specials and Christmas shows. Episode running times for Seasons 1 & 2 was 26 minutes. Seasons 3 to 10 had a regular running time of 44 minutes. Season 11-14 episodes have a regular running time of 52 minutes. The 15th season airing on Foxtel in 2023 has a running time of 30 minutes.

Discography

Albums

DVD releases
 RocKwiz Salutes The Bowl was released on DVD in Australia on 21 August 2009
 RocKwiz Duets vol 1-3 DVDs were collected into a box set released on DVD in Australia on 28 May 2010
 Season 1 was released on DVD in Australia on 5 October 2011
 Season 2 was released on DVD in Australia on 5 October 2011
 Season 3 was released on DVD in Australia on 30 November 2011
 Season 4 was released on DVD in Australia on 6 June 2012

Awards and nominations

ARIA Music Awards
The ARIA Music Awards is an annual awards ceremony that recognises excellence, innovation, and achievement across all genres of Australian music. They commenced in 1987. 

! 
|-
| ARIA Music Awards of 2012
| The RocKwiz Christmas Album
| Best Original Soundtrack, Cast or Show Album
| 
| 
|-

See also
Spicks and Specks, a similar ABC music quiz show.

References

External links
 
 
 Rockwiz at the National Film & Sound Archive
  sing "Fairytale of New York"
 

2005 Australian television series debuts
2016 Australian television series endings
2023 Australian television series debuts
Australian panel games
2000s Australian game shows
2010s Australian game shows
2020s Australian game shows
Australian television series revived after cancellation
Australian music television series
English-language television shows
Musical game shows
Rock music television series
Special Broadcasting Service original programming
Fox8 original programming